Tarakab (also Romanized as Tarakāb and Tarkāb; also known as Tarakow) is a village in Holayjan Rural District, in the Central District of Izeh County, Khuzestan Province, Iran. At the 2006 census, its population was 269, in 45 families.

References 

Populated places in Izeh County